Wendy Raquel Robinson is an American actress. She is best known for her roles as high school principal Regina "Piggy" Grier on The WB comedy sitcom The Steve Harvey Show (1996–2002), and as sports agent Tasha Mack on The CW/BET/Paramount+ comedy-drama The Game (2006–present).

Early life and education
Robinson was born in Los Angeles, California. She attended Howard University, where she graduated cum laude with a Bachelor of Fine Arts in drama.

Career
She made her acting debut in 1993 on an episode of Martin. That same year she guest starred on episodes of Thea and The Sinbad Show. 
From 1995 to 1996, Robinson co-starred on the short-lived NBC sitcom Minor Adjustments, starring Rondell Sheridan. The following year she won the role of Regina "Piggy" Grier in The WB sitcom The Steve Harvey Show which aired for six seasons. After the series ended its run in 2002, she appeared on the short-lived sketch comedy series Cedric the Entertainer Presents with her former Steve Harvey co-star Cedric the Entertainer.  Robinson also made guest appearances on The Parkers, All of Us, and The New Adventures of Old Christine. Robinson has also appeared in several films including The Walking Dead, followed by roles in  A Thin Line Between Love and Hate (1996), Ringmaster (1998), Two Can Play That Game (2001), and Rebound (2005). In 2000, she played Miss California in the film Miss Congeniality.

In 2006, Robinson began portraying the role of Tasha Mack, in the comedy The Game. After three seasons, the series was canceled by The CW on May 21, 2009. BET struck a deal with The Game'''s parent company CBS to develop new episodes of the series, relocating taping of the show from Los Angeles to Atlanta, and announcing its renewal at the April 2010 upfronts.  The Game returned to the air for a fourth season on January 11, 2011, The series ended in 2015. She also appeared on Shonda Rhimes' Grey's Anatomy in 2010. In 2014, she was cast as Cruella de Vil in the Disney's Descendants. In 2017, she has appeared in the film Flatliners, and had a recurring role on the short-lived ABC comedy series, The Mayor.

In 2018, Robinson was cast in the ABC comedy-drama series Grand Hotel opposite Demián Bichir and Roselyn Sánchez. In 2022 she featured in the Netflix series Family Reunion'' as Joyce.

Philanthropy
In 1996, Robinson co-founded the Amazing Grace Conservatory, a school that predominantly serves children from 5 to 18 years old from disadvantaged socioeconomic backgrounds in the fields of the arts and media production. Robinson serves as the school's artistic director. The school has provided a safe haven and training for thousands of young people. Some notable members include Issa Rae, Rhyon Nicole Brown, and Elle Varner.

Filmography

Film

Television

Awards and nominations

References

External links
 wendyraquel.com Wendy Raquel Robinson Official Website
 

Living people
African-American actresses

American film actresses
American television actresses
Howard University alumni
Actresses from Los Angeles
20th-century American actresses
21st-century American actresses
American voice actresses
20th-century African-American women
20th-century African-American people
21st-century African-American women
21st-century African-American people
Year of birth missing (living people)